Ann-Sofi Roos (born 27 November 1959) is a former Swedish Olympic swimmer. She competed in the breaststroke and individual medley events in the 1976 Summer Olympics and in the 1980 Summer Olympics.

Clubs
Kristianstads SLS

References

1959 births
Living people
Swimmers at the 1976 Summer Olympics
Swimmers at the 1980 Summer Olympics
Olympic swimmers of Sweden
Swedish female breaststroke swimmers
Swedish female medley swimmers
20th-century Swedish women